Didi Seven, and DiDiSeven or DiDi7, and Didi7, is a stain remover made famous by its infomercial television marketing campaign.

Didi Seven was first marketed in 1967, after years of development by a German businessman named Walter Willmann, an inventor working within the chemical industry, in the town of Renningen near Stuttgart, Germany.

Willmann named the product using the nickname of a childhood friend, Edith "DiDi" Koster. The number 7 was chosen because Willmann considered it his lucky number since his July 16, 1925 birthdate added up to seven in various combinations.

The product was sold successfully by Willmann through a network of live demonstrators at consumer shows and retail venues throughout Europe for many years and in 1987, an associate of Interwood, Tim Devlin, saw a live demonstration in Selfridges in London, and was impressed by how well the product worked. He bought a tube to bring back to Canada.

Shortly thereafter, in 1987, a contract was signed for Interwood to be the exclusive distributor of Didi Seven in North America. The product was actually first sold by Devlin with a version of the German live demonstrations at Canada's largest consumer show called the Canadian National Exhibition during the late summer of 1987. Valuable experience was learned by Interwood and Devlin. This experience was distilled and incorporated into a 2-minute direct response television (DRTV) commercial that was produced at a local TV station in Barrie, 60 miles north of Toronto.

The product was tested on air in Canada with the 2 minute DRTV commercial in the fall of 1987 and it was a huge success. Shortly thereafter, it was tested by Interwood in the US and was equally successful in that market. Didi Seven was a niche product that was brought to the market at the right time. The massive amount of TV it received resulted in the development of a long term brand not only in North America but also around the world.

The product was rolled out into a national program in both markets on TV and through other channels of distribution including print, live demonstration, catalogs, credit card syndication and retail. In 1988, the product was also launched in the UK on British TV and also throughout Europe on the newly launched cable satellite networks using the same creative and commercial that had been so successful in North America. In 1989, a 28:30 minute infomercial was made and rolled out on TV in both markets. All of this television created a tremendous amount of consumer awareness.

Because of the tremendous surge in volume and the need for Interwood to control all aspects of the product including defending against counterfeit goods that appeared in the US, Interwood acquired all of the assets of Walter Willmann GmbH in the fall of 1989. The manufacturer processes and equipment were moved to Ontario where a contract manufacturer continued to make the product. In 1991, CNN launched feeds through the Middle East, Latin America and Asia and asked Interwood to be an advertiser. Distribution was set up all of these countries and by the mid-1992, Didi Seven was being sold in 100+ markets around the world.

In total, over 20 million tubes had been sold by year 2000. In the March 2000 edition of US Consumer Reports, Didi Seven was cited as being "effective and very versatile" and "the best single product, although pricey." In February 2003, it was selected for The Best Products on The Oprah Winfrey Show.

Throughout the 1990s Interwood retained Dr. J. W. Smith, professor and Chairman of the Department of Chemical Engineering and Applied Chemistry for the University of Toronto to be a technical consultant, and to assist with developing appropriate manufacturing and quality protocols.

In 2003, Interwood launched Didi Seven Ultra with an improved formula, and more convenient packaging.  In 2011, Interwood Marketing was acquired by Northern Response. As of 2022, Didi Seven is available for purchase at getdidi7.com, both in the US and internationally.

References

Cleaning products
Laundry detergents